The 2015 La Route de France is an elite women's cycling stage race that took place in France between 9 and 15 August. It was the ninth edition of La Route de France. The race was won by Elisa Longo Borghini, who won two stages including the queen stage to La Planche des Belles Filles. She finished 1' 18" ahead of Amber Neben, with Claudia Lichtenberg a further eight seconds back in third. The best young rider was Jenelle Crooks (Australia). The mountains classification was won by Tetyana Ryabchenko.

Teams 

16 teams were invited to take part in the race.

Stages

Prologue 

9 August 2015 – Enghien-les-Bains to Enghien-les-Bains,  (ITT)
The opening prologue was a 3 km loop of left hand bends ideally suited to track cycling specialists. Amy Pieters of Team Liv–Plantur won the opening stage with an average speed of 49.315 km/h.

Stage 1 

10 August 2015 – Avon to Briare, 
The first stage had a delayed start with local organisers in dispute with police around road closures. It was won by Lucy Garner of Team Liv–Plantur.

Stage 2 

11 August 2015 – Villemandeur to Bourges, 
This was another flat stage suited to road sprinters. Two time world champion Giorgia Bronzini of Team Wiggle–Honda won from race leader Amy Pieters (Liv-Plantur) and a fast finishing Kimberley Wells (Australia).

Stage 3 

12 August 2015 – Nevers to Avallon, 
Elisa Longo Borghini (Ita) Wiggle–Honda was victorious on a mountainous stage 3 gaining 13 seconds from her nearest rival Eugenia Bujak.

Stage 4 

13 August 2015 – Autun to Louhans, 
Long-limbed Australian all-rounder Loren Rowney won stage 4 ahead of fellow Australian Annette Edmondson in a sprint finish.

Stage 5 

14 August 2015 – Vesoul to La Planche des Belles Filles, 
Elisa Longo Borghini Wiggle–Honda won again on a mountain-top finish, gaining an additional 45 seconds on second-placed veteran Amber Neben.

Stage 6 

15 August 2015 – Soultzmatt to Guebwiller, 
Giorgia Bronzini from Wiggle–Honda sprinted to another victory ahead of consistent Loren Rowney, and Amy Pieters.

External links

References 

La Route de France
La Route de France
La Route de France